Peros is a surname. Notable people with the surname include:

Nick Peros (born 1963), Canadian classical composer
Steven Peros, American playwright, screenwriter, director and television writer

See also
Pero (name)